sRGB is a standard RGB (red, green, blue) color space that HP and Microsoft created cooperatively in 1996 to use on monitors, printers, and the World Wide Web. It was subsequently standardized by the International Electrotechnical Commission (IEC) as IEC 61966-2-1:1999. sRGB is the current defined standard colorspace for the web, and it is usually the assumed colorspace for images that are neither tagged for a colorspace nor have an embedded color profile.

sRGB essentially codifies the display specifications for the computer monitors in use at that time, which greatly aided its acceptance. sRGB uses the same color primaries and white point as ITU-R BT.709 standard for HDTV, a transfer function (or gamma) compatible with the era's CRT displays, and a viewing environment designed to match typical home and office viewing conditions.

An amendment of the IEC 61966-2-1 standard document that defines sRGB includes the definition of a number of variants including sYCC, which is a Y′Cb′Cr′ luma-chroma-chroma color representation of sRGB colors with an extended range of values in the RGB domain (supporting negative values in the RGB domain).

sRGB definition

Gamut

sRGB defines the chromaticities of the red, green, and blue primaries, the colors where one of the three channels is nonzero and the other two are zero. The gamut of chromaticities that can be represented in sRGB is the color triangle defined by these primaries. As with any RGB color space, for non-negative values of R, G, and B it is not possible to represent colors outside this triangle, which is well inside the range of colors visible to a human with normal trichromatic vision.

The primaries come from HDTV (ITU-R BT.709), which are somewhat different from those for older color TV systems (ITU-R BT.601). These values were chosen to reflect the approximate color of consumer CRT phosphors at the time of its design. Since flat-panel displays at the time were generally designed to emulate CRT characteristics, the values also reflected prevailing practice for other display devices as well.

Transfer function ("gamma") 

The IEC specification indicates a reference display with a nominal gamma of 2.2, intended to be similar to the gamma response of CRT displays. The ability to directly display sRGB images on a CRT without any lookup greatly helped sRGB's adoption. Gamma also conveniently places more numbers near the black, reducing visible quantization artifacts.

The standard further defines a nonlinear electro-optical transfer function (EOTF), which exactly defines the conversion from image data to output intensity. A linear section is near zero, in order to avoid an infinite or zero slope that an exponential has, this is spliced to a curved section designed so the overall function is very close. In order to do this a formula using a higher exponent (2.4 in this case) is necessary. The instantaneous gamma (the slope when plotted on a log:log scale) varies from 1 in the linear section to 2.4 at maximum intensity, with a median value being close to 2.2.

In practice a pure  may be used with sRGB data with very little difference, this is referred to as "simple sRGB" by Adobe, and also what happens when it is displayed unchanged on a CRT.

Computing the transfer function 

If these are joined at the point  then:

If the slopes match at this point, then the derivatives must also be equal:

We now have two equations. If we take the two unknowns to be  and  then we can solve to give

This gives . These values, rounded to  sometimes describe sRGB conversion.

Draft publications by sRGB's creators further rounded , resulting in a small discontinuity in the curve. Some authors adopted these incorrect values, in part because the draft paper was freely available and the official IEC standard is behind a paywall.

Viewing environment 

The sRGB specification assumes a dimly lit encoding (creation) environment with an ambient correlated color temperature (CCT) of 5003 K. This differs from the CCT of the illuminant (D65). Using D50 for both would have made the white point of most photographic paper appear excessively blue. The other parameters, such as the luminance level, are representative of a typical CRT monitor.

For optimal results, the ICC recommends using the encoding viewing environment (i.e., dim, diffuse lighting) rather than the less-stringent typical viewing environment.

Transformation

From sRGB to CIE XYZ
When represented digitally as 8-bit numbers, these color component values are in the range of 0 to 255, and should be divided (in a floating point representation) by 255 to convert to the range of 0 to 1.

These gamma-expanded values (sometimes called "linear values" or "linear-light values") are multiplied by a matrix to obtain CIE XYZ (the matrix has infinite precision, any change in its values or adding not zeroes is not allowed):

This is actually the matrix for BT.709 primaries, not just for sRGB, the second row corresponds to the BT.709-2 luma coefficients (BT.709-1 had a typo in these coefficients).

From CIE XYZ to sRGB
The CIE XYZ values must be scaled so that the Y of D65 ("white") is 1.0 (X = 0.9505, Y = 1.0000, Z = 1.0890). This is usually true but some color spaces use 100 or other values (such as in CIELAB, when using specified white points).

The first step in the calculation of sRGB from CIE XYZ is a linear transformation, which may be carried out by a matrix multiplication. (The numerical values below match those in the official sRGB specification, which corrected small rounding errors in the original publication by sRGB's creators, and assume the 2° standard colorimetric observer for CIE XYZ.) This matrix depends on the bitdepth.

These linear RGB values are not the final result; gamma correction must still be applied.
The following formula transforms the linear values into sRGB:

These gamma-compressed values (sometimes called "non-linear values") are usually clipped to the 0 to 1 range. This clipping can be done before or after the gamma calculation, or done as part of converting to 8 bits. If values in the range 0 to 255 are required, e.g. for video display or 8-bit graphics, the usual technique is to multiply by 255 and round to an integer.

Usage

Due to the standardization of sRGB on the Internet, on computers, and on printers, many low- to medium-end consumer digital cameras and scanners use sRGB as the default (or only available) working color space. However, consumer-level CCDs are typically uncalibrated, meaning that even though the image is being labeled as sRGB, one can't conclude that the image is color-accurate sRGB.

If the color space of an image is unknown and it is an 8 bit image format, sRGB is usually the assumed default, in part because color spaces with a larger gamut need a higher bit depth to maintain a low color error rate (∆E). An ICC profile or a look up table may be used to convert sRGB to other color spaces. ICC profiles for sRGB are widely distributed, and the ICC distributes several variants of sRGB profiles, including variants for ICCmax, version 4, and version 2. Version 4 is generally recommended, but version 2 is still commonly used and is the most compatible with other software including browsers. Version 2 of the ICC profile specification does not officially support piecewise parametric curve encoding ("para"), though version 2 does support simple power-law functions. Nevertheless, lookup tables are more commonly used as they are computationally more efficient. Even when parametric curves are used, software will often reduce to a run-time lookup table for efficient processing.

As the sRGB gamut meets or exceeds the gamut of a low-end inkjet printer, an sRGB image is often regarded as satisfactory for home printing. sRGB is sometimes avoided by high-end print publishing professionals because its color gamut is not big enough, especially in the blue-green colors, to include all the colors that can be reproduced in CMYK printing. Images intended for professional printing via a fully color-managed workflow (e.g. prepress output) sometimes use another color space such as Adobe RGB (1998), which accommodates a wider gamut. Such images used on the Internet may be converted to sRGB using color management tools that are usually included with software that works in these other color spaces.

The two dominant programming interfaces for 3D graphics, OpenGL and Direct3D, have both incorporated support for the sRGB gamma curve.
OpenGL supports textures with sRGB gamma encoded color components (first introduced with EXT_texture_sRGB extension, added to the core in OpenGL 2.1) and rendering into sRGB gamma encoded framebuffers (first introduced with EXT_framebuffer_sRGB extension, added to the core in OpenGL 3.0). Correct mipmapping and interpolation of sRGB gamma textures has direct hardware support in texturing units of most modern GPUs (for example nVidia GeForce 8 performs conversion from 8-bit texture to linear values before interpolating those values), and does not have any performance penalty.

sYCC 
Amendment 1 to IEC 61966-2-1:1999, approved in 2003, includes the definition of a Y′Cb′Cr′ color representation called sYCC, which is based on sRGB except for supporting negative values of the R, G and B components and thus allowing for an extended-gamut. Although the RGB color primaries are based on BT.709, the equations for transformation from sRGB to sYCC and vice versa are based on BT.601 instead of BT.709.

This is also used by scRGB.

The amendment also recommends a higher-precision XYZ to sRGB matrix using seven decimal points, to more accurately invert the sRGB to XYZ matrix (which remains at the precision shown above):

.

Additionally, the amendment contains an extended-gamut encoding for sRGB called bg-sRGB and a YCC transformation for it called bg-sYCC.

References

Standards
 IEC 61966-2-1:1999 is the official specification of sRGB. It provides viewing environment, encoding, and colorimetric details.
 Amendment A1:2003 to IEC 61966-2-1:1999 describes an sYCC encoding for YCbCr color spaces, an extended-gamut RGB encoding, and a CIELAB transformation.
 sRGB, International Color Consortium
 The fourth working draft of IEC 61966-2-1 is available online, but is not the complete standard. It can be downloaded from www2.units.it.
 Archive copy of sRGB.com, now unavailable, containing much information on the design, principles, and use of sRGB

External links
 International Color Consortium
 A Standard Default Color Space for the Internet – sRGB the early, obsolete draft of the standard at w3.org
 Conversion matrices for RGB vs. XYZ conversion
 Will the Real sRGB Profile Please Stand Up?

1996 introductions
Color space
Film and video technology